Row or ROW may refer to:

Exercise
Rowing, or a form of aquatic movement using oars
Row (weight-lifting), a form of weight-lifting exercise

Mathematics and informatics 
Row vector, a 1 × n matrix in linear algebra
 Row(s) in a table (information), a data arrangement with rows and columns
Row (database), a single, implicitly structured data item in a database table
Tone row, an arrangement of the twelve notes of the chromatic scale

Other
Reality of Wrestling, an American professional wrestling promotion founded in 2005
Row (album), an album by Gerard
Right-of-way (transportation), ROW, also often R/O/W.
The Row (fashion label)

Places 
Rów, Pomeranian Voivodeship, north Poland
Rów, Warmian-Masurian Voivodeship, north Poland
Rów, West Pomeranian Voivodeship, northwest Poland
Roswell International Air Center's IATA code
 Row, a former spelling of Rhu, Dunbartonshire, Scotland
The Row (Lyme, New York), a set of historic homes
The Row, Virginia, an unincorporated community
Rest of the world or RoW

See also
Row house
Controversy, sometimes called "row" in British English
Column groups and row groups
Skid row
Rowe (disambiguation)
Rowing (disambiguation)
Rho (disambiguation)
Line (disambiguation)
Column (disambiguation)